Arunkumar is a given name and surname. Notable people with the name include:

Arun 
 Arunkumar Guththur, Indian politician 
 Arunkumar Mehta (born 1940), Indian businessman
 Arunkumar Vaidya (born 1926) General in the Indian Army

surname 
 B. Arunkumar, Indian politician 
 G. Arunkumar, Indian politician 
 J. Arunkumar (born 1975), Indian cricketer

Others  
 Arun Vijay (born 1977), Indian actor sometimes credited as Arunkumar

See also 
 Arun (given name)